Robert Francis Goheen (August 15, 1919 – March 31, 2008) was an American academic, president of Princeton University and United States Ambassador to India.

Biography
Robert Francis Goheen was born on August 15, 1919, to Anne (Ewing) and Dr Robert H. H. Goheen in Vengurla, India, where both his parents were serving as Presbyterian medical missionaries. His early education through the tenth grade was at Kodaikanal International School in India. After moving to the United States in 1934, he completed his secondary school education at the Lawrenceville School in New Jersey in 1936. He then attended Princeton University, where he won the Moses Taylor Pyne Prize and graduated summa cum laude with an A.B. in classics in 1940 after completing a senior thesis titled "A Study of the Nature and Object of Tragedy." He was also an avid soccer player.

During World War II, Goheen trained at Camp Ritchie and became one of many Ritchie Boys. His training as an intelligence officer at Ritchie during the war, in part, helped Goheen reach the rank of lieutenant colonel. He returned to Princeton after the war to pursue graduate studies, earning a Ph.D. in classics in 1948 after completing a doctoral dissertation titled "The imagery of Sophocles' Antigone (a study of poetic language and structure)." Goheen was one of the first four students to receive a fellowship from The Institute for Citizens & Scholars, established at Princeton to encourage war veterans to pursue a career in teaching.

In 1942, Goheen married Margaret Skelly. They had four daughters (Anne, Trudi, Megan, and Elizabeth) and two sons (Stephen and Charley), who gave them 18 grandchildren, including the American novelist Megan Crane.

Goheen was elected to the American Academy of Arts and Sciences in 1962 and the American Philosophical Society in 1986.

Princeton University career
Goheen taught classics at Princeton as an assistant professor from 1950 until 1957, when he was appointed the university’s 16th president. He served as president of the university from 1957 to 1972. At 37, he was the youngest man to assume that position since the 18th century.  Faced with the social and political challenges of the 1960s, Goheen encouraged student involvement in decision-making processes and initiated active recruitment of minorities, as well as overseeing the admission of women in 1969. The New York Times reported after his death: "Dr. Goheen would eventually build or acquire 38 buildings, increasing the university’s indoor square footage by 80 percent. He quadrupled the budget, doubled alumni giving and increased the number of faculty members by 40 percent. ... The university changed fundamentally under Dr. Goheen’s leadership, going from an establishment cradle to a diversified and complex research university. He attacked the exclusivity of the eating clubs, even opening one to be run by the university. He hired Princeton’s first black administrator and first black full professor and aggressively recruited promising minority students."

Later life
After his retirement from Princeton in 1972, he was named president of the Council on Foundations in New York. On January 1, 1977, he became president of the Edna McConnell Clark Foundation, but that April he was appointed by President Jimmy Carter to become United States Ambassador to India.  He served in the country of his birth from 1977 to 1980.

He returned to Princeton University in 1981, serving on the faculty of the Princeton School of Public and International Affairs.  He was involved with many activities related to Asia, including a Study Mission to the Philippines in January 1986 sponsored by the Asia Society.

He died in Princeton, New Jersey on March 31, 2008.

References

External links
Robert F. Goheen Papers at the Seeley G. Mudd Manuscript Library, Princeton University
Princeton University biography and index to papers
 Rediff.com interview of Robert Goheen, March 1997

2008 deaths
1919 births
Presidents of Princeton University
Ambassadors of the United States to India
Princeton University alumni
Princeton University faculty
United States Army personnel of World War II
American University of Beirut trustees
Kodaikanal International School alumni
Lawrenceville School alumni
United States Army officers
Ritchie Boys
Members of the American Philosophical Society
20th-century American diplomats
20th-century American academics